Þorsteinn Pálsson (pronounced ; born 29 October 1947) served as prime minister of Iceland for the Independence Party from 1987 to 1988. Þorsteinn led the Independence Party from 1983 to 1991, when he lost an inner partial election to then vice-chairman of the party and mayor of Reykjavík, Davíð Oddsson.

Prior to his period as Prime Minister, Þorsteinn was Minister of Finance from 1985 to 1987. He represented Southern Iceland in the Althing (Iceland's Parliament) from 1983 to 1999. When Davíð Oddsson formed his first government in 1991 he appointed Þorsteinn as minister of Fisheries and Justice and Ecclesiastical Affairs. He remained in this position until 1999. Later he became ambassador, first in London and later in Copenhagen. He was editor of the newspaper Fréttablaðið between 2006 and 2009.

References

|-

|-

|-

|-

1947 births
Thorsteinn Palsson
Thorsteinn Palsson
Thorsteinn Palsson
Thorsteinn Palsson
Thorsteinn Palsson
Thorsteinn Palsson
Thorsteinn Palsson
Thorsteinn Palsson
Thorsteinn Palsson
Living people
Thorsteinn Palsson
Thorsteinn Palsson